Yiannis Parios is a Greek singer, with a career spanning five decades.

Biography 
Yiannis Parios was born Ioannis Varthakouris (Ιωάννης Βαρθακούρης) on the island of Paros. He made his first appearance as a singer in 1969.

Yannis Parios was the first Greek singer to perform Alain Barriere's song "Tu t'en vas" with Greek lyrics.  Under its new title "Tora pia", the song was a hit, on an unprecedented scale for the time, and it marked the beginning of a new age in which many Greek singers adapted "foreign" melodies to Greek lyrics.

Yiannis Parios has worked with many of the leading Greek composers, including Manos Loizos, Giorgos Hatzinasios, Stavros Xarchakos, Stamatis Spanoudakis, Yorgos Katsaros, Marios Tokas, Yannis Spanos and Mikis Theodorakis.

He has written lyrics of his own, and often composed music. A number of his songs have been translated and sung abroad. One of his releases holds the record for Greek sales (one million and four hundred thousand units): this was the album "Nisiotika", released in 1982 and consisting of a collection of songs of the Aegean islands which, as an islander himself, he may have learnt and first sang in childhood.

Yiannis Parios has performed of Greece, at Royal Albert Hall, Carnegie Hall and most of the major venues in Canada, Australia, the United States, Germany, Belgium, Switzerland, Turkey and Israel.

Parios has four sons from two marriages. His oldest son, Harry Varthakouris, is also a singer.

Discography 
Yiannis Parios (1971)
Ti theleis na kano (1972)
Anthropina kai kathimerina (1973)
Pou tha paei pou (1974)
Erhontai stigmes (1975)
Tora pia (1976)
Mi fevgeis mi (1977)
Na giati se agapisa (1978)
Tha me thymitheis (1979)
Se hreiazomai (1980)
Ena gramma (1981)
Ta nisiotika (1982)
Otan vradiazi (1983)
Pio kali i monaksia (1984)
Ego kai esy (1985)
Xarhakos-Parios (1986)
Ola gia ton erota (1987)
I megaliteres epityxies tou (1987)
Pistos (1988)
Ta erotika tou '50 (1988)
I parastasi arxizi (1989)
San trelo fortigo (1989)
Ki ego mazi sou (1990)Epithesi agapis (1991)Ta nisiotika 2 (1992)Epafi (1992)Panta erotevmenos (1993)Vios erotikos (1994)Parea me ton Harry (1995)I monaksia mes ap' ta matia mou (1996)Tipsis (1997)Tosa grammata (1998)Dose mou ligaki ourano (1999)Parios erotas (2000)O erotikos Theodorakis (2001)Alli mia fora (2001)Mia varka na pas apenanti (2002)To kalo pou sou thelo (2003)Mia sinithismeni mera (2003)De gyrizo piso (2005)Ta dueta tou erota (2006)Pou pame meta (2008)Symperasma ena (2009)Ta kommatia ths psyxhs mou (2010)O kyklos tou erota (2013)O dikos mou Tsitsanis (2013)Oneira kano'' (2014)

References

External links 
 Unofficial website 
 Biography 
 

1946 births
Living people
People from Paros
21st-century Greek male singers
Greek entehno singers
Greek laïko singers
Greek folk singers
Greek lyricists
Minos EMI artists
Ballad musicians
20th-century Greek male singers